The naval Battle of Cuddalore took place on 29 April 1758 during the Seven Years' War near Cuddalore off the Carnatic coast of India and was an indecisive battle between a British squadron under Vice-Admiral George Pocock and French squadron under Comte d'Aché. British casualties were 29 killed and 89 wounded, while France lost 99 killed and 321 wounded. Although the battle itself was indecisive, the French fleet was able to achieve its primary objective of delivering the reinforcements that the defenders of Pondicherry were awaiting.

The two squadrons met again on 3 August in the battle of Negapatam and again on 10 September 1759 in the battle of Pondicherry.

Ships involved

Britain (George Pocock)

France (d'Aché)

See also
 Great Britain in the Seven Years War
 France in the Seven Years War

Notes

References

Bibliography

Naval battles of the East Indies Campaign (1757–1763)
Conflicts in 1758
Battle of Cuddalore
Battle of Cuddalore
Naval battles involving France
Naval battles involving Great Britain
History of Tamil Nadu